Cataraqui (also called Cataraque) was a British barque which sank off the south-west coast of King Island in Bass Strait on 4 August 1845. The sinking was Australia's worst ever maritime civil disaster incident, claiming the lives of 400 people.

Construction and technical details
Cataraqui was an 802 ton barque, of dimensions 138 × 30 × 22 feet (42 × 9 × 7 metres). The ship was built in Quebec, Lower Canada in 1840 by the shipwrights Williams Lampson. The name Cataraqui comes from the French transliteration of "Katerokwi", the original Mississaugas First Nation name for the area now known as Kingston, Ontario.

Voyage to Australia
Cataraqui was purchased and registered in Liverpool, England by Smith & Sons, for the purpose of transporting assisted emigrants to Port Phillip in the Colony of New South Wales (now Victoria, Australia).

On 20 April 1845, the ship sailed from Liverpool under the command of Captain Christopher Finlay. The ship's manifest on departure included 369 emigrants and 41 crew (410 total, including the captain). The voyage was fairly uneventful apart from the loss of a crew member overboard. By the time the vessel neared Australia, five babies had been born and six others had died.

Sinking
As Cataraqui entered Bass Strait in the early morning of 4 August, she encountered a severe storm. At about 04.30 hours, the ship was cast suddenly onto jagged rocks just off Fitzmaurice Bay on King Island off the north-western coast of Tasmania. Attempts to evacuate the ship were hindered by the large waves and heavy weather which washed many of the ship's occupants overboard. Eight crewmen managed to reach the shore by clinging to floating wreckage, where they encountered the only emigrant survivor, Solomon Brown. The nine castaways were stranded on King Island for five weeks until they were rescued by the cutter Midge and taken to Melbourne. 314 recovered bodies were buried on King Island in five graves.

Memorial
A memorial plaque is dedicated to the Cataraqui at the Tasmanian Seafarers' Memorial at Triabunna on the east coast of Tasmania.

The plaque contains the following text:

See also
 Immigration history of Australia
 List of disasters in Australia by death toll
 Lemon, Andrew & Morgan, Marjorie (1995). Poor souls, they perished: the Cataraqui, Australia's worst shipwreck. Collingwood, Vic, Australian Scholarly Pub. . OCLC: 36986583.

Notes

External links
 The Ships List: Loss of Cataraque, 1845
 — Dead Link — King Island Online: Wreck of the Cataraqui
 Shipwrecks of Tasmania
 Project Gutenberg: "Thrilling Stories Of The Ocean", by Marmaduke Park
 "Narrative of Mr Guthrie, Chief Officer of the Cataraque"

Shipwrecks of Bass Strait
History of Australia (1788–1850)
Maritime incidents in August 1845
King Island (Tasmania)
1840 ships
1845 in Australia
1788–1850 ships of Australia